Hartmaniella may refer to:
 Hartmaniella (polychaete), a genus of annelids in the family Hartmaniellidae
 Hartmaniella (plant), a genus of plants in the family Caryophyllaceae